The Model is a 2016 Danish thriller drama film directed by Mads Matthiesen and written by Matthiesen, Martin Zandvliet and Anders August. The film stars Maria Palm and Ed Skrein.

Plot 
A young Danish model named Emma is fighting for a breakthrough in the Parisian fashion world. Her journey to the center of the city of fashion, Paris, and the glamorous life as a top model evolve into a true drama, as Emma meets the attractive and somewhat older fashion photographer Shane White. Emma begins to love her lifestyle, and with Shane by her side, the fashion industry's doors begin to open. But soon Emma finds that love also has gloomy facets, and her dreams are challenged by both Shane and an unexpected, dark side of herself.

Cast
 Maria Palm as Emma
 Ed Skrein as Shane White
 Yvonnick Muller as André
 Dominic Allburn as Sebastian 
 Virgile Bramly as Marcel 
 Thierry Hancisse as Bernard 
 Marco Ilsø as Frederik

Reception 
The Model received mixed reviews from critics. On review aggregator Rotten Tomatoes, the film has a rating of 71%, based on seven reviews, with an average rating of 5.87/10. Metacritic gives the film a score of 58 out of 100, based on six critics, indicating "mixed or average reviews".

The main criticisms of the film were its narrative, particularly plot development, and lack of character development. Variety stated, "The screenplay by Matthiessen and co-writers Martin Pieter Zandvliet and Anders Frithiof August is compelling up until the melodramatic, credulity-straining final act, although the characters, apart from Emma, feel underdeveloped". Neil Genzlinger of The New York Times wrote, "The bodies are thin in the Danish film and so is the plot, though the real-life model who plays the lead role acquits herself well enough".

References

External links
 
 
 

2016 thriller drama films
2016 films
Danish thriller drama films
2010s Danish-language films
2010s English-language films
Films about modeling
Films set in Denmark
Films set in Paris
2010s French-language films
Zentropa films
2016 drama films
2016 multilingual films
Danish multilingual films